Sarita Catherine Louise Choudhury (born 18 August 1966) is a British actress, known for her role as Mina in the Mira Nair-directed feature film Mississippi Masala (1991). Choudhury has played roles in American and international films and television shows such as in Kama Sutra: A Tale of Love (1996), A Perfect Murder (1998), 3 A.M. (2001), and the John Cassavetes remake Gloria (1999). In 2002, she starred in Just a Kiss. She played a lesbian virgin in Spike Lee's She Hate Me (2004) and acted as Anna Ran in Lady in the Water, a 2006 thriller by M. Night Shyamalan. She also played Egeria in The Hunger Games: Mockingjay – Part 2 (2015) and co-starred with Tom Hanks in the 2016 film A Hologram for the King. In 2021, Choudhury joined the cast of HBO Max's Sex and the City revival television series And Just Like That....

Early life 
Choudhury was born in Blackheath, London, England, and is of half Indian and half English descent. Her mother, Julia Patricia (née Spring), is English, and her father, Prabhas Chandra Choudhury, a scientist, is Indian. They married in 1964 in Lucea, Jamaica. Choudhury studied economics and film at Queen's University in Kingston, Ontario, Canada. She has one younger brother, Kumar Michael Choudhury, and one older brother, Chandra Paul Choudhury.

Career 
Choudhury starred opposite Denzel Washington in the 1991 film Mississippi Masala, for which she received her Screen Actors Guild (SAG) card. She was still working as a waitress in Manhattan's East Village to make ends meet while the film was in theatres. After her debut film Mississippi Masala became an art house hit, Choudhury acted as a Pakistani country-western singer in Wild West (1992), a Chilean maid who is raped in Bille August's adaptation of The House of the Spirits, and a lesbian mother in Fresh Kill.

Choudhury appeared on Homicide: Life on the Street for five episodes during the 1998–99 season as Dr. Kalyani, a medical examiner. Choudhury played the role of the King's mistress, Helen Pardis, in the NBC drama Kings. The series was based upon the Biblical story of King David but set in modern times. Her character's Biblical counterpart was Rizpah, a concubine of King Saul.

She worked with independent film director Sona Jain in For Real. In an interview with The Statesman she said, "After Mississippi Masala and Kama Sutra I started getting offers in New York... doing theatres... I just went with the flow. One fine day, I thought that I haven't been back to India, haven't shot there and that's something I wanted to. There were Bollywood offers but it was not until Sona's script that made me look at India." The film had a commercial release in September 2010.

She appears as character Saul Berenson's wife, Mira in the TV series Homeland.
In 2011, she appeared in the joint British/French TV series Death in Paradise. Choudhury also had a brief cameo the 2013 comedy Admission. She appeared in the films The Hunger Games: Mockingjay – Part 1 (2014) and The Hunger Games: Mockingjay – Part 2 (2015), as President Snow's assistant, Egeria. In 2015-2016, she appeared as the Deputy White House Political Director Sophia Varma in the American crime drama Blindspot. In 2016 she starred with Tom Hanks in the film A Hologram for the King, and in 2021 she appeared in the film The Green Knight with Dev Patel.

Filmography

Film

Short Film

Television

See also 
 Indians in the New York City metropolitan area

References

External links 

 
 Rediff nterview
 Heyoka Magazine nterview with John LeKay
Eastern Eye Interview

1966 births
English people of Indian descent
English people of Bengali descent
British actresses of Indian descent
American people of Indian descent
American people of Anglo-Indian descent
American people of Bengali descent
American actresses of Indian descent
Living people
People from Blackheath, London
Actresses from London
20th-century English actresses
21st-century English actresses
Actresses from Kent
Queen's University at Kingston alumni
21st-century American women